At the Sign of the Reine Pédauque is a historical novel by Anatole France, written in 1892 and published the next year. The novel tells of the tribulations of the young Jacques Ménétrier at the beginning of the 18th century. Its most important source is the 17th-century occult text Comte de Gabalis.

Summary
Jacques Ménétrier is the son of Léonard Ménétrier, leader of a brotherhood of roast-meat sellers. Somewhat educated by Brother Ange, a dissolute capucin, Jacques replaces the dog Miraut in his job of turning the spit on which the chickens roast.  He is soon taken under the protection of Mr. Jérôme Coignard, an abbot, who rebaptises him "the learned Jacobus Tournebroche" and teaches him Latin and Greek. The two of them are hired by Mr. d'Astarac, an alchemist researching salamanders and sylphs in the works of ancient authors.

The rants of d'Astarac, the debauchery of Mr. d'Anquetil, and the vengeance of the uncle of the beautiful Jahel result in the happiness destined for the master and student, Jérôme and Jacques.

Adaptations 
Composer Charles-Gaston Levadé adapted the novel into a four-act lyric comic opera in 1934.  Tenor Jean Marny of the Opéra-Comique recorded an aria from the work, "Reverie de Jacques," on Pathé sapphire disc 3175.

Traktér U královny Pedauky (1967) is a Czechoslovak television film directed by Zdeněk Kaloč, starring Josef Karlík, Leopold Franc, Libuše Geprtová, and Václav Postránecký. Running time 84 min.

References

External links
 
 

1893 French novels
Novels by Anatole France
French historical novels
Fiction about alchemy